Valea Mărului may refer to several places in Romania:

 Valea Mărului, a commune in Galați County
 Valea Mărului, a village in Budeasa Commune, Argeș County
 Valea Mărului, a village in Lipova Commune, Bacău County
 Valea Mărului, a tributary of the Bârsa in Brașov County
 Valea Mărului, a tributary of the Prahova near Azuga, Prahova County
 Valea Mărului, a tributary of the Prahova near Sinaia, Prahova County
 Valea Mărului, a tributary of the Rusca in Caraș-Severin County
 Valea Mărului (Someș), a left tributary of the river Someșul Mic in Cluj County

See also 
 Măru (disambiguation)